Slater Building may refer to:

 Slater Building (Worcester, Massachusetts), listed on the NRHP in Massachusetts
 Slater Building (La Grande, Oregon), listed on the NRHP in Oregon